The Star (translit. Zvezda) is a 2002 Russian film directed by Nikolai Lebedev, a large modern project of Mosfilm. It is based on a short story of the same name by Emmanuil Kazakevich, about a group of Soviet scouts working behind enemy lines during Operation Bagration in World War II. The story had previously been made into a 1953 film of the same name.

Aleksei Kravchenko won a government award for his role in this film.

Plot
A team of Soviet scouts is sent behind enemy lines to find the location of the German armor forces. The Soviets wait until night, and open up with an artillery barrage. As the guns fire, the team advances. The team successfully slips behind enemy lines. Many dramatic scenes follow. In one, a German soldier is captured and interrogated. In another, the team calls an airstrike on German positions, causing great damage and casualties. One man even kills a German soldier with his pistol during the air attack. This tract of scenes finds the main characters successfully finding the location of the German armor. They are eventually cornered in a barn, with Germans attacking on all sides. During the battle, the team leader sends a radio message, telling the location of enemy armor. The team is eventually overrun and wiped out.

Cast

 Igor Petrenko as Lt. Travkin
 Artyom Semakin as Pvt. Vorobiev
 Aleksei Panin as Sgt. Mamochkin
 Aleksei Kravchenko as Sgt. Anikanov
 Anatoly Gushchin as Pvt. Bykov
 Amadu Mamadakov as Pvt. Temdekov
 Yuri Laguta as Sgt. Brazhnikov
 Yekaterina Vulichenko as Pvt. Katya Simakova
 Andrei Yegorov as Capt. Barashkin
 Alexander Dyachenko as Ltc. Galiyev
 Timofey Tribuntsev as episode
 Aleksandr Ustyugov as episode (uncredited)

Reception
Eddie Cockrell of Variety called it "an ordnance-packed war epic" and said that it was well made and might appeal to international audiences but that "Westerners have seen this formula before in Spielberg’s opus".

References

External links
 
 

2002 drama films
2002 films
2000s war drama films
Eastern Front of World War II films
Films based on short fiction
Films directed by Nikolai Lebedev
Films shot in Moscow
Films shot in Russia
Mosfilm films
2000s Russian-language films
Russian war drama films
Russian World War II films